Jamie Noguchi is a Japanese/Chinese-American artist and webcomic author who currently publishes Yellow Peril, an Asian-American office romance comedy webcomic, and Sherlock Holmes' Seriously Short Mini Mysteries, with Steve Napierski. The first Yellow Peril compilation, Back to the Grind: A Yellow Peril Collection, was published in 2011 and the second, The Client is Always: A Yellow Peril Collection, was published in 2013. Noguchi was also the first in the series of illustrators for the Erfworld webcomic.  During his time as illustrator, it was listed as one of Time magazine's "Top 10 Graphic Novels of 2007".

Separately, Noguchi is a co-founder of Super Art Fight, a show based in Baltimore, Maryland, where notable artists engage in a real-time artistic competition incorporating various design elements over the course of 30 minutes, occasionally opting to interact with each other's art in a battle, with audience participation determining the winner.

Yellow Peril

Music 
Noguchi has released 5 singles, including "Shit Mother F****r, Goddamn. <ref  </ref>

References

External links
 Yellow Peril
 Sherlock Holmes' Seriously Short Mini Mysteries
 Super Art Fight

American webcomic creators
American comic strip cartoonists
Living people
Year of birth missing (living people)